Ctenuchidia gundlachia is a moth of the subfamily Arctiinae. It was described by Schaus in 1904. It is found on Cuba.

References

Arctiinae
Moths described in 1904
Endemic fauna of Cuba